Dance Madness is a 1926 American silent comedy film directed by Robert Z. Leonard based upon a script by Frederica Sagor. The film starred Claire Windsor, Conrad Nagel, and Hedda Hopper. 

According to the credited screenwriter, Frederica Sagor, Dance Madness was "patently a rewrite" of The Guardsman, a work by Ferenc Molnár that was later directly adapted for film. Sagor notes the screenplay was not written by her, but by Alice D. G. Miller, and she only provided script rewrites.

Plot
As described in a film magazine review, Roger Halladay weds May Russell, a former dancer. He becomes infatuated with Valentina, the notorious masked Russian dancer. May discovers that Valentina's husband is Strokoff, who taught her dancing. The two women unite to teach Roger a lesson. May, always masked, poses as Valentina while trying to seduce Roger and arranges to have Strokoff find them while they are embracing. Roger runs away, followed by his masked charmer until he discovers that she is his wife and they are reconciled.

Cast
 Conrad Nagel as Roger Halladay
 Claire Windsor as May Russell
 Hedda Hopper as Valentina
 Douglas Gilmore as Bud
 Mario Carillo as Strokoff
 Elmo Billings
 Estelle Clark as Minor Role (uncredited)
 Joyzelle Joyner as Dancer (uncredited)
 Belva McKay as Minor Role (uncredited)

Preservation
Dance Madness is now considered to be a lost film.

References

External links

Stills at silenthollywood.com
 (Dance Madness clip starts at 1:56)

1926 films
1926 comedy films
Silent American comedy films
American silent feature films
American black-and-white films
Lost American films
Metro-Goldwyn-Mayer films
Films directed by Robert Z. Leonard
1926 lost films
Lost comedy films
1920s American films